West Point is a home rule-class city in Hardin County, Kentucky, United States, near the edge of Fort Knox military reservation on Dixie Highway. It is located in a former meander bend of the Ohio River. The population was 797 at the 2010 census, down from 1,100 at the 2000 census.

West Point is part of the Elizabethtown–Fort Knox Metropolitan Statistical Area.

History

West Point was founded by pioneer James Young, who built a cabin at the site in 1789 and, in 1797, built a brick house and inn that is still standing today. In 1803, Lewis and Clark passed nearby and recruited West Point citizen John Shields to join their Corps of Discovery.

West Point sits at the confluence of the Ohio and Salt rivers, a strategic position that led Union forces to construct a fort here during the Civil War to protect their supply routes. Fort Duffield is the state's largest and best-preserved earthen fortification from the period.

West Point also retains many of its other historic resources, and a large portion of the community is listed in the National Register of Historic Places as a historic district.

One of the newest preservation projects in West Point is the rehabilitation of the West Point Independent Colored School (1926), one of the "Rosenwald Schools" built by philanthropist Julius Rosenwald to educate African-Americans in rural areas. Plans call for using the one-room school as a visitor, educational, and research facility.

West Point commemorated the bicentennial of Lewis and Clark's visit with a heritage festival that celebrated local history and drew heritage tourists. Year-round, Fort Duffield is an important tourist destination, and the city recently secured a grant to fund walking trails at the site.

West Point was a childhood residence of the late Louisiana Governor James A. Noe, Sr., a wealthy oilman and landowner.

Geography
West Point is located at the northern end of Hardin County at  (37.991543, -85.954540), at the confluence of the Ohio and Salt rivers. The Dixie Highway (U.S. Routes 31W and 60) passes through the city just east of the downtown, leading northeast  to Louisville and south  to Elizabethtown, the Hardin County seat. The city is bordered to the south by the northern end of Fort Knox.

Demographics

As of the census of 2000, there were 1,100 people, 439 households, and 281 families residing in the city. The racial makeup of the city was 98.09% White, 0.64% African American, 0.64% Native American, 0.09% Asian, 0.09% from other races, and 0.45% from two or more races. Hispanics or Latinos of any race were 0.82% of the population.

There were 439 households, out of which 31.4% had children under the age of 18 living with them, 43.7% were married couples living together, 14.8% had a female householder with no husband present, and 35.8% were non-families. 29.8% of all households were made up of individuals, and 11.6% had someone living alone who was 65 years of age or older. The average household size was 2.51 and the average family size was 3.09.

The age distribution was 26.2% under 18, 10.6% from 18 to 24, 30.0% from 25 to 44, 20.6% from 45 to 64, and 12.5% who were 65 or older. The median age was 34 years. For every 100 females, there were 101.1 males. For every 100 females age 18 and over, there were 97.1 males.

The median income for a household in the city was $29,792, and the median income for a family was $35,139. Males had a median income of $23,611 versus $18,125 for females. The per capita income for the city was $13,381. About 15.9% of families and 20.3% of the population were below the poverty line, including 29.3% of those under age 18 and 15.1% of those age 65 or over.

Education
West Point Independent School District currently operates a single K-8 school, while high school students attend Elizabethtown High School of the Elizabethtown Independent Schools. On January 28, 2020, the West Point Independent Schools Board of Education voted unanimously to begin merger negotiations with Hardin County Schools; the West Point board approved the merger on February 18 and the Hardin County board followed two days later. The merger takes effect on July 1, 2020. The relocation of students is expected to send kindergarten students to North Park Elementary, first through fifth grades to Vine Grove Elementary, and sixth through eighth grade to J.T. Alton Middle School. Students who attended Elizabethtown High before the merger can complete their high school there, while future West Point high school students will attend North Hardin High School.

In popular culture
West Point and neighboring town Muldraugh are the main setting of the open world survival horror game Project Zomboid.

See also
 List of cities and towns along the Ohio River

References

External links
 City of West Point official website
 West Point School

Cities in Hardin County, Kentucky
Cities in Kentucky
Populated places established in 1789
Elizabethtown metropolitan area
Kentucky populated places on the Ohio River
1789 establishments in Virginia